Alec Regula (born August 6, 2000) is an American professional ice hockey defenseman currently playing for the Rockford IceHogs in the American Hockey League (AHL) as a prospect to the Chicago Blackhawks of the National Hockey League (NHL). 

Growing up in Michigan, Regula began playing organized youth hockey with the Plymouth Stingrays of the Little Caesars Amateur Hockey League before being promoted to the Compuware program and Detroit Honeybaked U-13 team. He then chose to play two years with the Cranbrook Schools before joining the Chicago Steel of the United States Hockey League and London Knights of the Ontario Hockey League. Regula was drafted 67th overall by the Detroit Red Wings in the 2018 NHL Entry Draft but was traded to the Chicago Blackhawks in exchange for Brendan Perlini on October 28, 2019.

Early life
Regula was born on August 6, 2000, in West Bloomfield Township, Michigan to parents C.J. and Nicole. Growing up, his father was the team dentist for the Detroit Red Wings of the National Hockey League so Regula spent time in the team dressing room at Joe Louis Arena.

Playing career

Amateur
Growing up in Michigan, Regula began playing organized youth hockey with the Plymouth Stingrays of the Little Caesars Amateur Hockey League before being promoted to the Compuware program and Detroit Honeybaked U-13 team. Following this, Regula chose to play two years with the Cranbrook Schools alongside his brother C.J. under head coach Andy Weidenbach.  As a freshman, he tallied three goals and nine assists to help lead the Cranbrook Cranes to the 2015 Division 3 state championship. Regula improved offensively the following season and accumulate four goals with 17 assists to be honored with second-team Division 3 all-state accolades. 

Following his sophomore season, Regula was drafted in the fourth round, 74th overall, by the London Knights of the Ontario Hockey League (OHL). Despite this, Regula played 53 games at right defense with the Chicago Steel of the United States Hockey League before joining the Knights. While with the Steel, Regula tallied five points in the regular season to help the Steel win the 2016 Clark Cup. He then participated in the 2017 CCM/USA Hockey All-American Prospects Game before joining the Knights for the 2017–18 season. 

During his first season with the Knights, Regula recorded seven goals and 18 assists through 67 games to be selected for the OHL First Team All-Rookie. By January 2018, Regula has tallied five goals and seven points and was ranked 43rd overall amongst draft-eligible North American skaters. At the conclusion of the season, Regula was drafted by the Detroit Red Wings in the third-round, 67th overall, of the 2018 NHL Entry Draft. He was then invited to attend the Red Wings Development Camp before returning to the Knights as co-captain alongside Liam Foudy.

Professional
He was acquired by the Blackhawks from the Red Wings in a trade for Brendan Perlini on October 28, 2019. He was signed to a three-year, entry-level contract with the Blackhawks on November 11, 2019.

Career statistics

Awards and honors

References

External links

Living people
2000 births
Ice hockey players from Michigan
Chicago Blackhawks players
American men's ice hockey defensemen
Detroit Red Wings draft picks
Chicago Steel players
London Knights players
Rockford IceHogs (AHL) players